The 2015 Eastern Illinois Panthers football team represented Eastern Illinois University as a member of the Ohio Valley Conference (OVC) during the 2015 NCAA Division I FCS football season. Led by second-year head coach Kim Dameron, the Eastern Illinois compiled an overall record of 7–5 overall with a mark of 7–1 in conference play, placing second in the OVC. The Panthers received an at-large bid to the NCAA Division I Football Championship playoffs, where they lost in the first round to Northern Iowa. The team played home games at O'Brien Field in Charleston, Illinois.

Schedule

Ranking movements

References

Eastern Illinois
Eastern Illinois Panthers football seasons
Eastern Illinois
Eastern Illinois Panthers football